Provincial Road 227 (PR 227) is a provincial road in the province of Manitoba, Canada.  It runs south of Lake Manitoba from the Yellowhead Highway (PTH 16) to PTH 6.

PR 227 is a well-traveled gravel road, used to access the many cottages located near Lake Manitoba and sometimes as a shorter alternative to the Trans-Canada Highway by those traveling between the Yellowhead and south Interlake region.  High water levels on Lake Manitoba in recent years have made certain portions of the road prone to flooding.

References

External links
Official Manitoba Highway Map

227